The Footprints on the Ceiling (1939) is a locked-room mystery novel written by Clayton Rawson.

It is the second of four mysteries featuring The Great Merlini, a stage magician and Rawson's favorite protagonist.

Plot summary

Ross Harte, publicity writer, is investigating the person behind a classified ad seeking a haunted house for sale.  When it turns out to be his old friend The Great Merlini, Harte drops by his store, The Magic Shop, looking for an explanation.  Harte and Merlini are soon swept up into a complex and bizarre plot involving the death of Linda Skelton, an agoraphobic heiress, at her home on Skelton Island, a tiny island in the East River of New York City.  The plot soon expands to involve a psychic researcher and his favourite medium, a group of treasure hunters seeking a sunken treasure, counterfeit golden guinea coins, a man with blue skin (argyria), a gangster named Charles Lamb, a second murder by "the bends", and a murder scene with a set of neat footprints marching across the ceiling.  Merlini survives more than one attempt on his life before he can call in the police and conclusively bring the crimes home to the guilty.

Trivia
The fictional Skelton Island, where the story is set, is roughly based on North Brother Island, NY. In the map included in the book, Skelton Island is shown south of the real-life North Brother Island, more or less where South Brother Island actually is.

1939 American novels
Novels by Clayton Rawson
Locked-room mysteries
Novels set in New York City
Novels set on islands
G. P. Putnam's Sons books